2-Octanone is an organic compound with the formula .  It is a colorless volatile liquid that is produced commercially for use in the fragrance industry.  Its is produced by the condensation of acetone and pentanal followed by hydrogenation of the alkene.  It can also be produced by selective oxidation of 1-octene.  It is one of three octanones, the others being 3-octanone and 4-octanone.  It is a common if trace component of many cooked foods.

See also
 Filbertone

References
 

Octanones
Perfume ingredients